Simalkot is a small village located in the Gangolihat tehsil of Pithoragarh district, Uttarakhand, India.

Demographics
 No. of households :   56
 Total population :   275
 Population- Male :   129
 Population- Female :   146
 Sex ratio :   1132 (females per 1000 males) 
 Literacy rate :   99.9%
 Male Literacy rate :   99.9%
 Female Literacy rate :   99.9%
 Photo Source: Census of India 2001

Gallery

References

External links
 Simal Kote

Villages in Pithoragarh district